Radu Albot and Mitchell Krueger are the defending champions, but chose not to defend their title .

Luke Saville and Jordan Thompson won the title, defeating Dayne Kelly and Matt Reid in the final 6–1, 4–6, [13–11] .

Seeds

Draw

References
 Main Draw

Launceston Tennis International - Doubles
2016 Men's Doubles
2016 in Australian tennis